Giacomo Moraglia (7 June 1791 – 1 February 1860) was a prolific Italian architect in the late Neoclassical period, remembered above all for his Porta Comasina (now Porta Garibaldi) in Milan.

Biography

Active in Lombardy and in Ticino, Switzerland, Moraglia had studied architecture and design at Milan's Brera Academy under Giocondo Albertolli, Carlo Amati and Giuseppe Zanoja before being accredited by Milan's powerful planning committee, the Commissione di Ornato, becoming one of its members in 1841. A prolific architect during the Neoclassical period, he completed hundreds of projects and restored many buildings including hospitals, factories, churches, schools, theatres and residences.

In Milan, he designed the arch at the Porta Comasina (1826) and the customs offices (1836) and also restored Santa Maria della Visitazione. In Monza, he designed San Gerardo and the Archdiocesan Seminary while in Gorgonzola he built the bell tower at the church of Santi Gervasio e Protasio. In the Swiss canton of Ticiono, he was responsible for the Palazzo Governativo (later the town hall) of Lugano (1844), the Teatro Sociale (1847) in Bellinzona, and the Villa Ghisler (1844) and San Carlo's Church (1846) in Magadino. In 1854 he built the presbytery and reconstructed the facade of Saint Bartholomew in Brugherio. Perhaps the last of his many projects was the church in Monte Olimpino (1857), north of (Como).

See also

References
This article is partly based on Wikipedia's Italian version.

Bibliography
R. Bergossi, G. Cisotto: Giacomo Moraglia 1791-1860, architetto, 1991 

19th-century Italian architects
Architects from Milan
1791 births
1860 deaths